The American Legion Hut (Decatur, Mississippi), also known as the Newton County American Legion Post No. 89 Hut, was built in 1934.  With , it was listed on the U.S. National Register of Historic Places in 2007.  It is significant for its Rustic style architecture as applied in Mississippi, which includes use of horizontal log walls, exposed rafters and trusses, and stone fireplaces.

The American Legion Post No. 89 was founded in 1920 with eighteen original members, most or all being veterans of World War I.

In 2006, the building was "largely intact and retains its 1934 character".

References

American Legion buildings
Cultural infrastructure completed in 1934
Clubhouses on the National Register of Historic Places in Mississippi
Rustic architecture in the United States
National Register of Historic Places in Newton County, Mississippi
1934 establishments in Mississippi
Rustic architecture in Mississippi